From the time of its admission to the Union in 1812, until the division into multiple districts a decade later, Louisiana had only one congressional district. During that time, three people represented the state at-large.

List of members representing the district 

In the 43rd Congress, Louisiana had six representatives.  Five were assigned a district and one represented the state at-large. Due to an election contest for the at-large seat, it was vacant until the very last day.

At-large seat eliminated March 4, 1875, as all six seats were divided among six districts.

References

 Congressional Biographical Directory of the United States 1774–present

At-large
Former congressional districts of the United States
At-large United States congressional districts